LaDonna M. Antoine-Watkins (born 20 November 1974 in Regina, Saskatchewan) is a Canadian retired sprinter who specialised in the 400 metres. She represented Canada at the 1996 and 2000 Summer Olympics, as well as three outdoor and one indoor World Championships.

Competition record

Personal bests
Outdoor
200 metres – 23.13 (0.0 m/s) (Edmonton 2001)
400 metres – 50.92 (Sydney 2000)
Indoor
200 metres – 24.03 (Quad 1997)
400 metres – 53.79 (Reno 1997)

References

External links
  (1994–1998)
  (1998–2001)
 
 
 

1974 births
Living people
Canadian female sprinters
Athletes (track and field) at the 1998 Commonwealth Games
Athletes (track and field) at the 2002 Commonwealth Games
Athletes (track and field) at the 1999 Pan American Games
Athletes (track and field) at the 1996 Summer Olympics
Athletes (track and field) at the 2000 Summer Olympics
Commonwealth Games medallists in athletics
Black Canadian female track and field athletes
Olympic track and field athletes of Canada
Athletes from Regina, Saskatchewan
Commonwealth Games bronze medallists for Canada
Pan American Games track and field athletes for Canada
World Athletics Championships athletes for Canada
Competitors at the 1995 Summer Universiade
Medalists at the 1997 Summer Universiade
Universiade bronze medalists in athletics (track and field)
Universiade bronze medalists for Canada
Medallists at the 1998 Commonwealth Games